The Big Apple Chorus is a barbershop chorus based in Manhattan, New York. The chorus, directed by Jack Pinto, was founded in 1983 and has close to 100 members. The Big Apple Chorus has competed in the Barbershop Harmony Society's international chorus competition, with a best finish of 2nd in 1987.

For several years, the chorus has regularly participated in the holiday concert series at the South Street Seaport, including the Living Christmas Tree—a group of carolers arranged in a tree, accompanying the first public Christmas tree in the city to be lit during the winter holiday season.

The chorus rehearses at 7pm on Monday nights at Norman Thomas High School, 111 East 33rd Street in Manhattan.

External links
Official website

Musical groups established in 1983
Barbershop Harmony Society choruses
A cappella musical groups
Choirs in New York City
Musical groups from New York City
1983 establishments in New York City